Maarandhoo (Dhivehi: މާރަންދޫ) is one of the inhabited islands of  Haa Alif Atoll and is geographically part of Thiladhummathi Atoll in the north of the Maldives. It is an island-level administrative constituency governed by the Maarandhoo Island Council.

Geography

Demography

References

External links
Isles: Maarandhoo

Islands of the Maldives